A gridshell is a structure which derives its strength from its double curvature (in a similar way that a fabric structure derives strength from double curvature), but is constructed of a grid or lattice.

The grid can be made of any material, but is most often wood (similar to garden trellis) or steel.

Gridshells were pioneered in the 1896 by Russian engineer Vladimir Shukhov in  constructions of exhibition pavilions of the All-Russia industrial and art exhibition 1896 in Nizhny Novgorod.

Large span timber gridshells are commonly constructed by initially laying out the main lath members flat in a regular square or rectangular lattice, and subsequently deforming this into the desired doubly curved form.  This can be achieved by pushing the members up from the ground, as in the Mannheim Multihalle. More recent projects such as the Savill Garden gridshell were constructed by laying the laths on top of a sizeable temporary scaffolding structure which is removed in phases to let the laths settle into the desired curvature.

Gridshell buildings
Shukhov Rotunda by Vladimir Shukhov, 1896
Mannheim Multihalle by Frei Otto and Arup Structures 3 (many of whose team members later left to found Buro Happold), a very large exhibition space constructed in 1975.
Japan Pavilion, Expo 2000, by Frei Otto, Buro Happold, Shigeru Ban and SONOCO, a gridshell of circular paper tubes , 2000.
Flimwell Woodland Enterprise Centre Modular Gridshell  by Feilden Clegg and Atelier One, 2000.
Weald & Downland Open Air Museum by Buro Happold and Edward Cullinan architects, a two-layer wooden gridshell, and the first gridshell constructed in the UK, 2002.
Pishwanton Hand-Built Gridshell  by David Tasker and Christopher Day, 2002.
Helsinki Zoo viewing platform by Ville Hara, 2003
Savill Building in Windsor Great Park by Buro Happold and Glenn Howells Architects, a large four-layer wooden gridshell, 2006.
Courtyard roofing of rural villa, Ostuni, Italy, by cmmkm architettura e design, Roberto Ruggiero, Alfonso Petta, Felice Grasso and Fabio Figlia, 2007.
Masseria Ospitale's terrace roofing, Lecce, Italy, by cmmkm architettura e design with Bernardino D'Amico and Filomena Nigro, 2010.
 Centre Pompidou-Metz by Shigeru Ban and Arup, 2010.
 Solidays 2011 Gridshell 
Gridshell pavilion for Naples School of Architecture courtyard by Andrea Fiore, Daniele Lancia, Sergio Pone, Sofia Colabella, Bianca Parenti, with Bernardino D'Amico (Structural Consultant) and Francesco Portioli (Structural Consultant), 2012.
Pavillion in Selinunte’s archeological site by cmmkm architettura e design and arch. Bernardino D’amico, arch. Andrea Fiore and arch. Daniele Lancia, 2012
SUTD Library Pavilion, Singapore, by SUTD City Form Lab and engineers at ARUP Singapore, 2013.
Bamboo amphitheater space structure, PUC Rio de Janeiro, by Bambutec, 2014.
Crossrail Place, London, by Foster + Partners, 2015.
Wisdome, Stockholm, 2022.

See also
 Tensile structure
 Stretched grid method
 Thin-shell structure
 Geodesic dome
 Hyperboloid structure
 Buckminster Fuller
 Norman Foster

Notes

Further reading
 
 "Grid Shells", B. Burkhardt, J. Hennicke, F. Otto, "IL", 1974, n. 10.
 "Timber lattice roof for Mannheim Bundesgartenschau", E. Happold, W.I. Liddell, in "The Structural Engineer" 1975, n.3 vol. 53.
 "Finding Form", F. Otto, B. Rash, Edition Alex Menges, Stuttgart, 1995
 "The Structural Engineering of the Downland Gridshell", R. Harris, O. Kelly, in G.A.R. Park, P. Disney, "Space Structure 5", vol. 1, MPG Books, Cornwall, 2002.
 "The Downland Grid Shell Innovative timber design", M. Dickson, R. Harris, in "The Royal Academy of Engineering Publication", n.18, 2004
 "The Savill Garden Gridshell Design and construction", R. Harris, S. Haskins, J. Roynon,  in "The Structural Engineer", n.17, vol 86, 2008
 "Design of Timber Gridded shell Structures", R, Harris, in "Proceedings of the Institution of Civil Engineers-Structures and Buildings", n. 164 (2) 2011
 "Gridshell. I gusci a graticcio in legno tra innovazione e sperimentazione", S. Pone, Alinea, Firenze 2012
 "Modeling of bending and torsion couplings in active bending structure: application to the design of elastic gridshells", L. du Peloux, PhD thesis, 2017
 "Construction of a Large Composite Gridshell Structure: A Lightweight Structure Made with Pultruded Glass Fibre Reinforced Polymer Tubes", L. du Peloux, F. Tayeb, O. Baverel, JF. Caron, Structural Engineering International 26(2):160-167, 2016
 "Gridshell Manual", S.H. Dyvik,J.H. Mork, Master thesis, 2015
 "Active bending and Tensile Pantographic Bamboo Hybrid Amphitheater Structure", M. Seixas, J. Bina, P. Stoffel, J.L.M. Ripper, L.E. Moreira, K. Ghavami, Journal of the International Association for Shell and Spatial Structures, Vol. 58 n. 193, 2017
"Form Finding and Analysis of an Active Bending-Pantographic Bamboo Space Structure", M. Seixas, L.E. Moreira, P. Stoffel, J. Bina, Journal of the International Association for Shell and Spatial Structures, Vol. 62 n. 209, 2021

External links
 Cullinan Throws a Curve
 www.gridshell.it
 Lothian Gridshell
 Past and Future of Grid Shell Structures

Lattice shell structures
Structural system
Russian inventions